6/8 may refer to:
 A fraction equivalent to 3/4 or 0.75.
 June 8 (month-day date notation)
 6 August (day-month date notation)
 , a time signature used in Western musical notation
 6/8 vision, a measure of visual acuity in metric units

See also
 8/6 (disambiguation)